Madhya Pradesh State Highway 8 (MP SH 8) is a State Highway running from Budhar town in Shahdol distinct via Darrikherwa, Rajendragram, Pushprajgarh, Nonghati and ultimately terminates at Amarkantak near the Madhya Pradesh - Chhattisgarh state border.

It connects the religious and tourist town of Amarkantak.

See also
List of state highways in Madhya Pradesh

References

State Highways in Madhya Pradesh